Freedom of speech is the freedom to speak without censorship or limitation.

Freedom of Speech may also refer to:

 Freedom of Speech (painting), a 1943 painting by Norman Rockwell

Music

Albums
 The Iceberg/Freedom of Speech... Just Watch What You Say!, a 1989 album by Ice-T
 Free Speech (album), a 1970 album by Eddie Harris
 Freedom of Speech (mixtape), by Freeway
 Freedom of Speech (Speech Debelle album)
 Freedom of Speech, a mixtape by Ghetto (now known as Ghetts)

Songs
 "Freedom of Speech", a song by Ice-T, performed with his band Body Count
 "Freedom of Speech", a song by Iceberg Slimm
 "Freedom of Speech", a song by Liquid Tension Experiment
 "Freddom of Speech", a song by J. Cole from D-Day: A Gangsta Grillz Mixtape